The California Department of Transportation (Caltrans) is an executive department of the U.S. state of California. The department is part of the cabinet-level California State Transportation Agency (CalSTA). Caltrans is headquartered in Sacramento.

Caltrans manages the state's highway system, which includes the California Freeway and Expressway System, supports public transportation systems throughout the state and provides funding and oversight for three state-supported Amtrak intercity rail routes (Capitol Corridor, Pacific Surfliner and San Joaquins) which are collectively branded as Amtrak California.

In 2015, Caltrans released a new mission statement: "Provide a safe, sustainable, integrated and efficient transportation system to enhance California’s economy and livability."

History

The earliest predecessor of Caltrans was the Bureau of Highways, which was created by the California Legislature and signed into law by Governor James Budd in 1895. This agency consisted of three commissioners who were charged with analyzing the roads of the state and making recommendations for their improvement. At the time, there was no state highway system, since roads were purely a local responsibility. California's roads consisted of crude dirt roads maintained by county governments, as well as some paved streets in certain cities, and this ad hoc system was no longer adequate for the needs of the state's rapidly growing population. After the commissioners submitted their report to the governor on November 25, 1896, the legislature replaced the Bureau with the Department of Highways.

Due to the state's weak fiscal condition and corrupt politics, little progress was made until 1907, when the legislature replaced the Department of Highways with the Department of Engineering, within which there was a Division of Highways. California voters approved an $18 million bond issue for the construction of a state highway system in 1910, and the first California Highway Commission was convened in 1911.  On August 7, 1912, the department broke ground on its first construction project, the section of El Camino Real between South San Francisco and Burlingame, which later became part of California State Route 82. The year 1912 also saw the founding of the Transportation Laboratory and the creation of seven administrative divisions, which are the predecessors of the 12 district offices in use . The original seven division headquarters were located in:
 Willits Mercantile Building for Del Norte, Humboldt, Lake, and Mendocino counties
 Redding C.R.Briggs Building for Lassen, Modoc, Shasta, Siskiyou, Tehama, and Trinity counties
 Sacramento Forum Building for Alpine, Amador, Butte, Calaveras, Colusa, El Dorado, Glenn, Nevada, Placer, Plumas, Sacramento, San Joaquin, Sierra, Solano, Stanislaus, Sutter, Tuolumne, Yolo, and Yuba counties
 San Francisco Rialto Building for Alameda, Contra Costa, Marin, Napa, San Francisco, Santa Clara, Santa Cruz, San Mateo, and Sonoma counties
 San Luis Obispo Union National Bank Building for Monterey, San Benito, Santa Barbara, and San Luis Obispo counties
 Fresno Forsythe Building for Fresno, Inyo, Kern, Kings, Madera, Mariposa, Merced, Mono, and Tulare counties
 Los Angeles Union Oil Building for Imperial, Los Angeles, Orange, Riverside, San Bernardino, San Diego, and Ventura counties

In 1913, the California State Legislature began requiring vehicle registration and allocated the resulting funds to support regular highway maintenance, which began the next year.

In 1921, the state legislature turned the Department of Engineering into the Department of Public Works, which continued to have a Division of Highways.  That same year, three additional divisions (now districts) were created, in Stockton, Bishop, and San Bernardino.

In 1933, the state legislature enacted an amendment to the State Highway Classification Act of 1927, which added over 6,700 miles of county roads to the state highway system. To help manage all the additional work created by this massive expansion, an eleventh district office was founded that year in San Diego. 

The enactment of the Collier–Burns Highway Act of 1947 after "a lengthy and bitter legislative battle" was a watershed moment in Caltrans history.  The act "placed California highway's program on a sound financial basis" by doubling vehicle registration fees and raising gasoline and diesel fuel taxes from 3 cents to 4.5 cents per gallon. All these taxes were again raised further in 1953 and 1963.  The state also obtained extensive federal funding from the Federal-Aid Highway Act of 1956 for the construction of its portion of the Interstate Highway System.  Over the next two decades after Collier-Burns, the state "embarked on a massive highway construction program" in which nearly all of the now-extant state highway system was either constructed or upgraded.  In hindsight, the period from 1940 to 1969 can be characterized as the "Golden Age" of California's state highway construction program. 

The history of Caltrans and its predecessor agencies during the 20th century was marked by many firsts. It was one of the first agencies in the United States to paint centerlines on highways statewide; the first to build a freeway west of the Mississippi River; the first to build a four-level stack interchange; the first to develop and deploy non-reflective raised pavement markers, better known as Botts' dots; and one of the first to implement dedicated freeway-to-freeway connector ramps for high-occupancy vehicle lanes.

In 1967, Governor Ronald Reagan formed a Task Force Committee on Transportation to study the state transportation system and recommend major reforms. One of the proposals of the task force was the creation of a State Transportation Board as a permanent advisory board on state transportation policy; the board would later merge into the California Transportation Commission in 1978.  In September 1971, the State Transportation Board proposed the creation of a state department of transportation charged with responsibility "for performing and integrating transportation planning for all modes." Governor Reagan mentioned this proposal in his 1972 State of the State address, and Assemblyman Wadie P. Deddeh introduced Assembly Bill 69 to that effect, which was duly passed by the state legislature and signed into law by Reagan later that same year.  AB 69 merged three existing departments to create the Department of Transportation, of which the most important was the Department of Public Works and its Division of Highways.  The California Department of Transportation began official operations on July 1, 1973.  The new agency was organized into six divisions: Highways, Mass Transportation, Aeronautics, Transportation Planning, Legal, and Administrative Services.  

Caltrans went through a difficult period of transformation during the 1970s, as its institutional focus shifted from highway construction to highway maintenance.  The agency was forced to contend with declining revenues, increasing construction and maintenance costs (especially the skyrocketing cost of maintaining the vast highway system built over the past three prior decades), widespread freeway revolts, and new environmental laws. In 1970, the enactment of the National Environmental Policy Act and the California Environmental Quality Act forced Caltrans to devote significant time, money, people, and other resources to confronting issues such as "air and water quality, hazardous waste, archaeology, historic preservation, and noise abatement." The devastating 1971 San Fernando earthquake compelled the agency to recognize that its existing design standards had not adequately accounted for earthquake stress and that numerous existing structures needed expensive seismic retrofitting.  Maintenance and construction costs grew at twice the inflation rate in this era of high inflation; the reluctance of one governor after another to raise fuel taxes in accordance with inflation meant that California ranked dead last in the United States in per capita transportation spending by 1983.  During the 1980s and 1990s, Caltrans concentrated on "the upgrading, rehabilitation, and maintenance of the existing system," plus occasional gap closure and realignment projects.

Administration
For administrative purposes, Caltrans divides the State of California into 12 districts, supervised by district offices. Most districts cover multiple counties; District 12 (Orange County) is the only district with one county. The largest districts by population are District 4 (San Francisco Bay Area) and District 7 (Los Angeles and Ventura counties). Like many state agencies, Caltrans maintains its headquarters in Sacramento, which is covered by District 3.

Districts

See also

 Transportation in California
 State highways in California
 California Manual on Uniform Traffic Control Devices
 United States Department of Transportation
 List of roads and highways

Notes

References

External links

 
 Named Highways, Freeways, Structures, and Other Appurtenances in California (PDF)